Alberrt Antoni is an Indian film director. His debut film as a director is critically acclaimed Kanne Madanguka (2005). He is the director of Nairsan, a forthcoming Indo-Japanese historical film, based on the legendary Indian freedom fighter A. M. Nair, popularly known as Nairsan in Japan, with the rare combination of Jackie Chan, Mohanlal and A. R. Rahman.

Biography
Albert is now in Mudavanmugal, Trivandrum, Kerala, and he was born in Agra, Uttar Pradesh. Albert native and did his schooling in Marthandam and took his bachelor's degree from University, Hyderabad and from the Govt. Film Institute of Chennai.

Albert's debut film Kanne Madanguka (2005) was selected for Indian Panorama 2005 screened at the International Film Festival of India, Goa (2005) and other overseas film festivals 2005–2006. It won three Kerala State Film Awards for Best actress, Best child artiste and Best processing.

Albert is the man behind Nairsan. Having identified the story and having invested a lot of his time and money in research, rights and backing, he is now raring to see the project go on the floors. It has a rare combination of Mohanlal, Jackie Chan and the Academy Award winner A. R. Rahman. Japan, Mongolia and India are the main locations of this huge budgeted project.

His high-points of the film were winning the Aravindan  Puraskaram Best debut Director award in 2005, Padmarajan Special Jury Award for best director (2006) and John Abraham special jury award (2005). His passion and vision on Nairsan is complemented by his tremendous urge to be open and discover new eras on the subject and to create a  truly international class Asian film, spanning many cultures, languages and religions.

Now he is in the post production work for his new project titled Vaadamalli. New faces are doing the central characters.

Filmography

Story
 Kanne Madanguka (2005)
 Vaadamalli (2011)
 Mudra, The Gesture - Short fiction (2017)

Awards
Aravindan Puraskaram
2005: Best debut director award for Kanne Madanguka
Padmarajan Special Jury Award
2006: Best Director Award for Kanne Madanguka
John Abraham Special Jury Award
2005: Best Director Award for Kanne Madanguka

References

External links

Malayalam film directors
Film directors from Uttar Pradesh
Malayali people
Living people
Year of birth missing (living people)
21st-century Indian film directors
M.G.R. Government Film and Television Training Institute alumni
People from Agra